Zwide may refer to:
 Zwide kaLanga, King of the Ndwandwe (Nxumalo) nation from about 1805 to around 1820
 Zwide, Eastern Cape Province, South Africa, a township in Port Elizabeth, South Africa